Noora Hautakangas (born 22 March 1984, in Soini) is Miss Finland (Miss Suomi) 2007 and was Finland's representative in Miss Universe 2007. She is currently studying for a degree in prosthetics and orthotics at Helsinki Polytechnic Stadia.

References

External links
 Photo Olli Pekonen/Petrilux

1984 births
Living people
People from Soini
Miss Finland winners
Miss Universe 2007 contestants